Saccharopolyspora hordei is a bacterium from the genus Saccharopolyspora which has been isolated from hay.

References

 

Pseudonocardineae
Bacteria described in 1989